The seventh season of American Idol, the annual reality show and singing competition, began on January 15, 2008, and concluded on May 21, 2008. Ryan Seacrest continued to host the show with Simon Cowell, Paula Abdul, and Randy Jackson returning as judges. David Cook was announced the winner of the competition on May 21, 2008, defeating runner-up David Archuleta by a margin of roughly 12 million votes out of over 97 million, which was at that time the highest recorded vote total in the show's history. The split was 56 to 44%.

The seventh season was the first season during which neither the winner nor the runner-up was ever in the bottom group during any week before the finale on May 21, 2008. It was also the second season during which both the winner and the runner-up were male contestants, with the second season being the first.

Changes from past seasons 
Prior to the start of the seventh season, Executive Producer Nigel Lythgoe admitted that the sixth season had placed more focus on the guest mentors than the contestants. Changes were planned for the seventh season designed to return attention to the contestants by providing more information on their backgrounds and families.

A major change for the seventh season was allowing contestants to play musical instruments, an element that originated on Australian Idol and can also be seen on Norway's Idol and Canadian Idol.  A brand new set was built, and a new introduction credit sequence was created. The season finale also moved from the Kodak Theatre to the larger Nokia Theatre in Los Angeles, which would be the venue for the live series finale for the next six years.

Regional auditions 
For the seventh season, auditions began in San Diego, California, on July 30, 2007, and continued in these cities:

Contestants were required to be between the ages of 16 and 28 on July 28, 2007, and eligible to work in the United States. Those ineligible include former contestants who had previously reached the semifinal of the first through third seasons, or the last phase of Hollywood round of fourth through sixth seasons (top 44 of the fourth and fifth seasons, top 40 of the sixth season), those holding recording or management contracts, or those who were not US citizens or landed immigrants (i.e. permanent residents).

One auditioner this year, Alexis Cohen, gained media attention due to her outraged reaction and profuse profanities after the judges rejected her in the Philadelphia audition.  She also returned in season eight to audition in New York and her audition was featured.  She was later found dead in a hit-and-run accident.

Another auditioner who gained some public attention was Renaldo Lapuz, who sang his own composition "We're Brothers Forever", which he wrote for Simon Cowell.  He was later asked to return to perform in the finale.

Hollywood week 
The Hollywood week took place at the Pasadena Civic Center in Pasadena, California, over a period of five days. A total of 164 contestants were invited from the seven audition cities. This year, the process was altered slightly to ensure that no talent would be prematurely dismissed, and there are no group stages. The contestants performed at least two songs during this round.

The first round of individual performances lasted two days. For the first time ever, contestants had the option of either being accompanied by the band or playing an instrument themselves, such as a keyboard, guitar, or drums. If the judges approved of the contestants performances, they received a "free pass", exempting the contestant from performing the second round, and 48 contestants were awarded. Unlike previous seasons, contestants whose performances are not considered good enough may award them a second chance in the second round rather than elimination. They lined up on stage in groups of 10 and each sang a short segment of a song a cappella. After each group had performed, the judges eliminated about 100 contestants.

In the final round, all the remaining contestants performed individually a song chosen from a large list of songs provided, accompanied by the band and three backup singers. After each performance, the judges decide the contestant's fate by advancing or to be sent home; 50 contestants emerged after the round ended. The judges then deliberated further on who should be in the top 24, and their decision was revealed the next day in the "Green Mile" episode.

One of the more prominent contestants during the Hollywood week was Josiah Leming, whose unhappiness with the backing band resulted in him dismissing the band. He was eliminated in the "Green Mile" episode. Another piece of drama involved contestant Kyle Ensley when Cowell voiced strong objection over him not being selected for the semifinals.  His non-selection was later revealed to have resulted in serious rift between Cowell and the show producer Nigel Lythgoe.

Semifinalists 

 Daniel 'Danny' Noriega (born September 29, 1989, in Azusa, California, 18 at the time of the show) auditioned in San Diego. He previously auditioned for Idol in the sixth season and made it to Hollywood week, but was cut in the first round. His elimination song was Soft Cell's version of "Tainted Love". Shortly following his elimination, Noriega received an offer from Rosie O'Donnell to perform on her cruise.
 Luke Menard (29 at the time of the show) auditioned in Omaha with "Bend and Break" by Keane. In Hollywood, he sang "Arthur's Theme (Best That You Can Do)" by Christopher Cross and "Grace Kelly" by Mika. He auditioned for the sixth season in Memphis and sang "How Deep Is Your Love", but did not make it to Hollywood. Prior to the seventh season of Idol, he was a member of the a cappella group Chapter 6.
 Robert "Robbie" Carrico (26 at the time of the show) is from Melbourne, Florida, and auditioned for the show in Miami. His professional singing career prior to American Idol includes being a member of the pop group Boyz N Girlz United, which opened for Britney Spears during her "...Baby One More Time Tour" in 1999.
 Jason Yeager (28 at the time of the show) is from Grand Prairie, Texas, and auditioned in Dallas. He appeared and was a finalist on the first season of Making the Band, the MTV reality show that led to the formation of boy band O-Town.
 Colton Berry (18 at the time of the show) is from Staunton, Virginia. He auditioned in Charleston.
 Garrett Haley (17 at the time of the show) is from Elida, Ohio. He auditioned in San Diego.
 Asia'h Epperson (19 at the time of the show) is from Joplin, Missouri, and auditioned in Atlanta singing "How Do I Live." Two days before the auditions, her father died in a car accident. Her elimination song was "I Wanna Dance With Somebody" by Whitney Houston.
 Kady Malloy (18 at the time of the show) is from Houston, Texas, and auditioned in Dallas. She became known on the show for her impersonation of Britney Spears and can also impersonate several other artists. Malloy is trained in opera singing. Her elimination song was "Who Wants to Live Forever" by Queen. She has released several songs to her MySpace and shot a video for a cover of "Time After Time" with Colton Berry. Simon's comment after her audition was: "Out of all of the people we have seen during this season you are the best."
 Alaina Whitaker (17 at the time of the show) is from Tulsa, Oklahoma, and auditioned in Dallas. She was a member of the female country group Della Rose along with Andrea Young and Erin James. Before the show, her sister and she won a talent competition in Tulsa. Her group Della Rose was working on their debut album in Nashville before they disbanded. The group has opened up for several major country acts including Travis Tritt, and Keith Anderson, who was also known as the group's mentor.
 Alexandréa Lushington (17 at the time of the show) is from Douglasville, Georgia, and auditioned in Atlanta. In 2004, she sang against fellow Idol semifinalist David Archuleta on an episode of the television show Star Search.
 Joanne Borgella (25 at the time of the show) was a model from Hoboken, New Jersey, who auditioned in Philadelphia. Before auditioning for Idol, she appeared in and won Mo'Nique's Fat Chance.
 Amy Davis (25 at the time of the show) is professional model from Lowell, Indiana, who auditioned in Dallas.

Semifinals 
The semi-finals began on February 19. There were three shows each week for the three weeks of the semi-finals. The February 19 through May 21 shows originated from CBS Television City in Hollywood.

The live show portion of the semifinals began on February 19, 2008. Similar to previous seasons since season four, starting with 12 women and 12 men, the women and men perform on weekly separate shows and on the result shows, each performing a song from a given decade (sixties, seventies and eighties songs in order), and the bottom two contestants each night are eliminated from the competition. The semi-finals took place over three weeks, meaning that six from each gender will be eliminated over the course of the competition, leaving the other six to form the top 12. The males performed on the first night, followed by the females thereafter.

Color key:

Top 24 – 1960s

Top 20 – 1970s

Top 16 – 1980s

Finalists

Finals 
There are 11 weeks of finals and 12 contestants compete and one finalist eliminated per week based on the American public's votes.

Color key:

Top 12 – Lennon–McCartney Songbook

Top 11 – The Beatles

Top 10 – Year They Were Born

Top 9 – Dolly Parton 
Dolly Parton served as the guest mentor this week.

Top 8 – Inspirational Music

Top 7 – Mariah Carey 
Mariah Carey served as the guest mentor this week,

Top 6 – Andrew Lloyd Webber 
Contestants performed a song from a selection of musicals originated by Andrew Lloyd Webber, who was also this week's guest mentor.

Top 5 – Neil Diamond 
For the first time this season, each contestant sang two songs. Neil Diamond served as the mentor this week.

Top 4 – Rock and Roll Hall of Fame

Top 3 – Judges' choice, Contestant's choice & Producer's Choice 
Each contestant sang three songs, with the choices decided by one of the three judges, the contestant itself, and the producers.

Finale – Clive Davis' choice, New Song & Contestant's Choice 
Each contestant sang three songs, a song from Clive Davis, a winner's single, and a contestant's chosen song.

Elimination chart
Color key:

Results night performances 
During the Hollywood weeks, "Hollywood's Not America" by Ferras played when contestants were eliminated, while "Best Days" by Graham Colton was the elimination song for the semi-finals round. For the finals, season 2 winner Ruben Studdard remade Kenny Loggins' "Celebrate Me Home" as the exit song.

Group song 
The contestants also performed medleys of songs from that week's theme.
 Top 24: A medley of songs from the 1960s, including "Needles and Pins" and "When You Walk in the Room" by The Searchers, "Spanish Harlem" by Ben E. King, and "Bend Me, Shape Me" by The American Breed.
 Top 20: A medley of songs from the 1970s, including "I Saw the Light" by Todd Rundgren, "It's a Heartache" by Bonnie Tyler, "The Things We Do for Love" by 10cc, and "I Feel the Earth Move" by Carole King.
 Top 12: A medley of songs by The Beatles including "All My Loving," "I Feel Fine," "Can't Buy Me Love," and "Help!."
 Top 11: A second medley of Beatles songs including "While My Guitar Gently Weeps," "Here, There and Everywhere," "Because," and "The End."
 Top 10: "Right Back Where We Started From" by Maxine Nightingale.
 Top 9: "9 to 5" by Dolly Parton.
 Top 8: "Shout to the Lord" by Hillsong.
 Top 7: "One Sweet Day" by Mariah Carey with Boyz II Men.
 Top 6: "All I Ask of You" from The Phantom of the Opera.
 Top 5: A medley of songs by Neil Diamond, including "Cracklin' Rosie," "Song Sung Blue," and "Brother Love's Travelling Salvation Show."
 Top 4: "Reelin' in the Years" by Steely Dan.
 Top 3: "Ain't No Stoppin' Us Now" by McFadden & Whitehead.

Finale
Top 12 – "Get Ready" (The Temptations).
Top 2 – "Hero" (Chad Kroeger and Josey Scott)
The top 2 meet Guru Pitka (Mike Myers)
 Seal and Syesha Mercado – "Waiting For You"
 Jason Castro– "Hallelujah"
Girl finalists – Donna Summer medley – "She Works Hard for the Money", "Hot Stuff"
Donna Summer with Top 12 girls – "Stamp Your Feet", "Last Dance"
 Carly Smithson and Michael Johns – "The Letter" (The Box Tops)
 Jimmy Kimmel
Guy finalists – Bryan Adams medley "Summer of '69", "Heaven"
Bryan Adams with the guys – "I Thought I'd Seen Everything", "Somebody"
 ZZ Top and David Cook – "Sharp Dressed Man"
 Graham Nash and Brooke White – "Teach Your Children"
 Jonas Brothers – "SOS"
 Renaldo Lapuz – "We're Brothers Forever"
 OneRepublic and David Archuleta – "Apologize"
 Jordin Sparks – "One Step at a Time"
 Gladys Knight (with Ben Stiller, Jack Black and Robert Downey, Jr. as the Pips) –  "Midnight Train to Georgia"
 Carrie Underwood – "Last Name"
Top 12 – George Michael medley – "Faith", "Father Figure", "Freedom"
 George Michael – "Praying for Time"
 David Cook – "The Time of My Life"

Other performances 
Guest artists may perform songs to promote their work or the show itself, or for charitable purpose. Most performed on the result shows, except for Ruben Studdard at the end of the Top 2 performance show and those on the Idol Gives Back special.  Included is a list of those songs with the impact of performance on the Billboard Hot 100 and Hot Digital Songs chart for the week.  See Idol Gives Back for the list of performances in that special episode.

*"Celebrate Me Home" was removed from iTunes the day after it was performed. It reached the top 60 before it was removed.

Idol Gives Back 

The "Idol Gives Back" initiative returned on April 9 for a second year, with a special start time of 7:30 p.m. ET, running for 150 minutes. Again, proceeds will go to children's charities in Africa and the United States. Unlike "Idol Gives Back 2007" when no finalist was eliminated (and two were eliminated in the following week), Michael Johns was eliminated during "Idol Gives Back 2008."

Controversies 
 Season 7 contestant Carly Smithson stirred up controversy due to a prior major label record deal she had with MCA Records. It has been reported  that MCA spent over 2 million dollars promoting Smithson's previous album "Ultimate High," which she made under the name Carly Hennessy. The album only sold 378 copies but is now available on iTunes. To further complicate things, Randy Jackson worked for MCA during the same period of time that Smithson was signed. The media noted that several of the other season 7 semi-finalists had previously also had record deals, including Kristy Lee Cook, Brooke White, and Michael Johns (David Cook released an independent solo album and had finished recording a follow-up prior to his audition for the show, but he was never involved with a record label or contract).  According to a poll conducted by AOL Television, 63 percent of those polled believed that contestants who have already had record deals should not be contestants on American Idol.  However, Idol rules state that contestants are eligible as long as they are no longer under contract when Idol begins, regardless of any past contracts.
 David Hernandez was revealed by VotefortheWorst.com to have worked as a stripper in Phoenix, AZ. According to the owner of Dick's Cabaret, David's job included a routine featuring full nudity and performing lap dances for male clientele.
 On the show of April 29, the five remaining contestants each sang two songs. Diverting from their usual format, due to time constraints, the judges' critiques after each performance were instead to be bundled until after both songs were performed. However, after the first round had finished, host Ryan Seacrest asked for comments, and judge Paula Abdul, in discussing Jason Castro, delivered feedback on his second song before he had performed it. This has led to speculation that the show is scripted or rigged. The next day, Abdul claimed on Seacrest's radio show that she listened to the performance in rehearsal and in the rushed atmosphere of the show was confused and thought she was supposed to critique both.
 The presence of David Archuleta's father was a matter of some discussion and he was banned from providing his son with musical input during his song preparation.

Releases

iTunes 
During Season 7, American Idol partnered with iTunes to make available for sale exclusive performance videos, live performance singles of the semi-finalists and full-length studio recordings of the songs that contestants performed on the show. In order to keep the competition fair, these singles were not allowed to appear on iTunes sales charts until after the finale.  The contestants' performances during the season were removed from sale soon after the finale.

The winning song, "The Time of My Life", was recorded by David Cook and released on May 22, 2008. The song was certified platinum by the RIAA on December 12, 2008. It was the first winner's song not to be performed during the competition as the Top 2 each selected a different song from a list of 10 entries in song-writing competition to perform instead. Cook performed "The Time of My Life" after Ryan Seacrest announced him as the winner of Season 7.

Post-Idol
David Cook's debut album was released on November 18, 2008, on 19 Recordings / RCA Records and was certified platinum by the RIAA on January 22, 2009. Cook teamed with Grammy winning producer Rob Cavallo (Green Day, Kid Rock) on the album. A single from the album, "Light On", was released and peaked at 20 on the billboard top 100 list. His sophomore album, This Loud Morning, was released on June 28, 2011.

David Archuleta signed with Jive Records and his self-titled debut album was released on November 11, 2008, and debuted at number two. Archuleta's album certified gold. Archuleta's first single, "Crush", debuted at number two on the Billboard Hot 100 and number one on the Hot Digital Songs chart, giving it the highest single debut of 2008 and the highest single debut in 18 months. The song has sold 1.9 million copies as of January 2009.

Albums
Personal/Individual Albums
 David Cook (David Cook)
 This Loud Morning (David Cook)
 Digital Vein (David Cook)
 David Archuleta (David Archuleta)
 Christmas from the Heart (David Archuleta)
 The Other Side of Down (David Archuleta)
 Begin (David Archuleta)
Postcards in the Sky (David Archuleta)
Winter in the Air (David Archuleta)
Therapy Sessions (David Archuleta)
 Jason Castro (Jason Castro)
 Who I Am (Jason Castro) 
 Only a Mountain (Jason Castro)
 High Hopes & Heartbreak (Brooke White)
 Tear the World Down  (Carly Smithson)
 Why Wait (Kristy Lee Cook)
 Hold Back My Heart (Michael Johns)
 Solidify (Amanda Overmyer)
 Till Death Do Us Party (Danny Noriega)

Singles

David Cook
"The Time of My Life"
"Light On"
"Come Back to Me"
"Bar-ba-sol"
"Permanent"
"Jumpin' Jack Flash"
"Don't You (Forget About Me)"
"The Last Goodbye"
"Fade into Me"
"The Last Song I'll Write for You"
"Laying Me Low"
"Wait For Me"
"Criminals"
"Broken Windows"
"Carry You (acoustic)"
"Gimme Heartbreak"
"Death of Me"
"Reds Turn Blue"
"Strange World"
"Fire"
"TABOS"

David Archuleta
"Crush"
"A Little Too Not Over You"
"Touch My Hand"
"Have Yourself A Merry Little Christmas" ft. Charice
"Something 'Bout Love"
"Elevator"
"Falling Stars"
"Everything And More"
"Wait"

Kristy Lee Cook
"15 Minutes of Shame"

Brooke White
"Hold Up My Heart"
"Radio Radio"
"Double Trouble"
"Night After Night"

Jason Castro
"Let's Just Fall In Love Again"

U.S. Nielsen ratings 
Season 7 of American Idol overall was the most watched primetime program in the United States for the fourth consecutive year, during the conclusion of the 2007–2008 television season.  The Tuesday episode viewership averaged 27.665 million while the Wednesday episode averaged 26.843 million, taking the top 2 spots for the season.  The show helped Fox become the most watched overall television network in the U.S. for the first time in its history (as well as a record first for a non-Big Three major network in American television history), and lead the 18–49 demographic ratings with still-standing largest ever margin since the introduction of the people meter technology in the Nielsen nationwide television tallies during the 1985–1986 television season.

See also
 American Idols LIVE! Tour 2008

References

External links
 Official American Idol Contestants Website
 

American Idol seasons
2008 American television seasons